Apricot Island is a 2011 Slovak drama-romance, starring Szidi Tobias.

The movie distributed by Film Europe, was directed by Peter Bebjak, while produced in common with Rastislav Šesták for their DNA Production company.

At the 19th Třinecké filmové babí léto, the work won Audience Award as the Best Debut Feature Film in September 2011. The same year, the film was shortlisted for the Slovak submission for the Academy Award for Best Foreign Language Film, but the nomination went to Gypsy.

Apart from the leading role, Tobias recorded the main theme of the movie entitled "Brehy". The song composed Slavo Solovic for lyrics by Peter Lipovský.

Cast
Szidi Tobias as Bábika
Attila Mokos as Lajcsi
Peter Nádasdy as Jancsi
György Cserhalmi as

Additional credits
Rastislav Gore - gaffer
Tomáš Zednikovič - cinematographer (second unit)
Oto Häusler - architect 
Juraj Petráň - make-up artist
Ján Kocman - costume designer
Peter Gajdoš - director of audiography

Awards

See also
List of Slovak submissions for the Academy Award for Best Foreign Language Film

References

External links
Marhuľový ostrov (official website)

2011 films
Slovak drama films
Slovak-language films